The House of Radagli or Radaljević (in Italian; Radaleus in Latin; Radaljević/Radeljević/Radelja in Croatian) was a noble family of the Republic of Venice in the 16th century and the Republic of Ragusa since 1666.

Members
Piero Nicolo Radagli ( 1551)
M. Francesco Radagli ( 1573), merchant
Marino Radagli ( 1596)
Pietro Radagli ( 1666), received Ragusan noble status for the family along with the Dimitri, Zlatarić, and Marinetti-Primi, after initial denial
Francesco Radagli (d. 1667), secretary
Giovanni di Radagli
Francesco Radagli, Franciscan.
Marino di Matteo Radagli
Marino Radagli
Francesco di Pietro Radagli, Latinist
Giuliano Radagli
Giuseppe Radagli
Jusepe Radagli, captain

References

Sources

External links
 

Ragusan noble families